Birmingham Children's Hospital is a specialist children's hospital located in Birmingham, England. The hospital provides a range of specialist services and operates the Child and Adolescent Mental Health Services (CAMHS) for the city. The service operates as part of Birmingham Women's and Children's NHS Foundation Trust, whose CEO is Sarah-Jane Marsh.

History
The hospital was founded by Thomas Pretious Heslop as the Birmingham and Midland Free Hospital for Sick Children at 138–9 Steelhouse Lane in 1862. It moved to a new site on Ladywood Middleway in 1917.

In March 1986, a charity concert was held called "Heart Beat 86" at the nearby National Exhibition Centre, featuring George Harrison, which raised money for the hospital.

In October 1998 the hospital returned to Steelhouse Lane, to the buildings previously used by the Birmingham General Hospital, as the Diana, Princess of Wales Children's Hospital - in honour of Diana, Princess of Wales, who had died the year before. The opening ceremony was carried out by the Queen.

In 2007, a new extension designed by RPS Group was opened. The extension created a burns unit, one of three such centres of excellence in the country. As well as this, it established an outpatients department, a neonatal ward, a burns operating theatre, as well as additional classrooms for the Education Centre, allowing children to continue their education whilst undergoing medium to long-term care in the hospital.

Facilities

The trust led a consortium of organisations called Forward Thinking Birmingham commissioned to provide mental health services for young people in the city up to the age of 25 from April 2016. Services for adults were previously provided by Birmingham and Solihull Mental Health NHS Foundation Trust.

In 1970, surgeons completed the first separation of conjoined twins at the hospital.

Management
The hospital was managed by the Birmingham Children's Hospital NHS Trust until 2017 when it merged with the Women's Hospital NHS Foundation Trust to create the Birmingham Women's and Children's NHS Foundation Trust.

The current chair of the trust is Sir Bruce Keogh and Chief Executive Sarah-Jane Marsh. She was appointed Chief Executive of Birmingham Women's NHS Foundation Trust with effect from 1 July 2015 and now runs the Birmingham Women's and Children's NHS Foundation Trust.

Performance
The trust was named by the Health Service Journal as one of the top hundred NHS trusts to work for in 2015. At that time it had 3236 full-time equivalent staff and a sickness absence rate of 3.39%. 89% of staff recommend it as a place for treatment and 74% recommended it as a place to work.

The Trust's Professor Anita Macdonald, Consultant Paediatric Dietitian was awarded an OBE for services to Dietetics in the Queen's Birthday Honours 2015.

In 2016, it became the first children's hospital to be rated Outstanding by the Care Quality Commission.

See also
 Healthcare in West Midlands
 List of hospitals in England
 List of NHS trusts

References

External links
 Birmingham Women's and Children's NHS Foundation Trust
 the Birmingham Children's Hospital National Health Service Trust (Establishment) Amendment Order 1999 (Statutory Instrument assigning name)

Children's hospitals in the United Kingdom
Hospital buildings completed in 1862
Hospital buildings completed in 1917
Hospitals in Birmingham, West Midlands
NHS hospitals in England
Hospitals established in 1862
1862 establishments in England